is a retired Japanese ice sledge hockey goaltender. He was part of the Japanese sledge hockey team that won a silver medal at the 2010 Winter Paralympics.

In 1991, he was diagnosed with chronic inflammatory demyelinating polyneuropathy which caused his disability.

References

External links 
 

1976 births
Living people
Japanese sledge hockey players
Paralympic sledge hockey players of Japan
Paralympic silver medalists for Japan
Ice sledge hockey players at the 2002 Winter Paralympics
Ice sledge hockey players at the 2006 Winter Paralympics
Ice sledge hockey players at the 2010 Winter Paralympics
Ice sledge hockey players at the 1998 Winter Paralympics
Medalists at the 2010 Winter Paralympics
People from Asahikawa
Sportspeople from Hokkaido
Paralympic medalists in sledge hockey